Michael Smith (born 16 March 1998) is a Canadian rugby union player, currently playing for the San Diego Legion of Major League Rugby (MLR) and the Canadian national team. His preferred position is flanker.

Professional career
Smith signed for Major League Rugby side San Diego Legion for the 2021 Major League Rugby season. Smith made his debut for Canada in the 2021 July rugby union tests.

Career statistics

References

External links
itsrugby.co.uk Profile

1998 births
Living people
Canadian rugby union players
Canada international rugby union players
Rugby union flankers
San Diego Legion players